The Violin Sonata in F minor, Op. 4, for violin and piano was composed by Felix Mendelssohn in 1823 and is the only one to carry an opus number. Mendelssohn composed two other violin sonatas, both in F major, that were not published in his lifetime. This was published with a dedication to his friend and violin teacher, Eduard Rietz, who was also dedicatee of the composer's Octet in E-flat major, Op. 20.

Movements 
The work has three movements:

 Adagio – Allegro moderato
 Poco adagio
 Allegro agitato

A typical performance lasts about 22 minutes.

Unlike his more famous violin work, the Violin Concerto in E minor, this sonata lacks dramatic exposition.  It does contain a calm beauty that is typical of the composer's chamber music, and it demonstrates the brilliance of his early compositions.

References

External links

Chamber music by Felix Mendelssohn
Mendelssohn 04
1825 compositions
Music dedicated to family or friends
Music dedicated to students or teachers
Compositions in F minor